The Spy is a 1917 American silent thriller film directed by Richard Stanton and starring Dustin Farnum, Winifred Kingston, and William Burress. It portrays the actions of American spy who travels to Germany during World War I to get hold of a list of German agents active in the United States. He succeeds with the help of a local woman who falls in love with him, but both are captured and executed.

Although the original production ran for 8 reels, it was sometimes reduced to six in certain regions probably due to censorship of some scenes. In Chicago it was banned due to scenes of graphic violence.

Cast
 Dustin Farnum as Mark Quaintance 
 Winifred Kingston as Greta Glaum 
 William Burress as Freiheer Von Wittzchaeft 
 Charles Clary as American Ambassador 
 William Lowry as The Shadow 
 Howard Gaye as Baron von Bergen

References

Bibliography
 Solomon, Aubrey. The Fox Film Corporation, 1915-1935: A History and Filmography. McFarland, 2011.

External links

 

1917 films
1910s thriller films
1910s English-language films
American silent feature films
American thriller films
American black-and-white films
Films directed by Richard Stanton
Fox Film films
Silent thriller films
1910s American films